The Chapel of the Holy Souls in Purgatory is a small neo-Gothic Catholic religious building located in the old town of Pontevedra (Spain), in Ánimas Street, near Curros Enríquez Square.

History 
The chapel is located on a small part of the site where the old hospital of Pontevedra used to be, which operated since the 15th century under the name of Corpus Christi and later St. John of God, the order that ran it.

This hospital had a cemetery, a church and an altar for the souls in Purgatory attached to it. The complex was demolished in 1896 when the city's new hospital, the Provincial Hospital of Pontevedra, was built. Faced with the loss of this centuries-old spiritual reference, the neighbours decided to ask for the construction of a small chapel where they could continue the tradition of their ancestors. Thus, under pressure from the neighbours, this small neo-Gothic chapel was built in 1898.

Description 
The chapel is dedicated to the souls in purgatory for whom alms are offered for their salvation, so that they may attain happiness in heaven.

The façade of the chapel, in neo-Gothic style and of small dimensions, is situated between party walls. It has a door with a pointed arch, accompanied by two windows with pointed arches on either side.

Above the entrance door is a small opening in the shape of a four-leaf clover framed by a circle, representing a lobed cross. At the top, the chapel is crowned by a cross within a circle.

Inside, there is a two-tiered polychrome wooden altarpiece with a total of six figures, depicted amidst flames, the central ones being a bishop and a king.

Gallery

References

External Sources

See also 

 Gothic Revival architecture
 Plaza de Curros Enríquez

External links 

 Chapel of the Souls on the website of Galicia Tourism
 Chapel of Souls on the Cityplan website

Roman Catholic chapels in Spain
Churches in Pontevedra
Gothic Revival architecture in Spain